Felipe Ponce Ramírez (born 29 March 1988) is a Mexican professional footballer who plays as a midfielder.

Honours
Alianza
Salvadoran Primera División: Apertura 2019

References

External links
Felipe Ponce at Ascenso MX

Living people
1988 births
Footballers from Durango
Mexican footballers
Mexican expatriate footballers
Liga MX players
Categoría Primera B players
Categoría Primera A players
Moldovan Super Liga players
Santos Laguna footballers
C.D. Veracruz footballers
Loros UdeC footballers
Boyacá Chicó F.C. footballers
Speranța Nisporeni players
Deportivo Pasto footballers
Alianza F.C. footballers
Mexican expatriate sportspeople in Colombia
Mexican expatriate sportspeople in Moldova
Mexican expatriate sportspeople in El Salvador
Expatriate footballers in Colombia
Expatriate footballers in Moldova
Expatriate footballers in El Salvador
Association football midfielders